Operation Papua New Guinea Assist was the Australian Defence Force's contribution to the Australian humanitarian effort in Oro Province, Papua New Guinea following heavy flooding caused by Cyclone Guba in November 2007. The humanitarian effort was being led by  AusAID and the ADF provided logistical support. The first ADF units involved in this operation deployed to Papua New Guinea on 21 November 2007 following a request from the PNG government. The operation was completed early December 2007.

The ADF force was designated Joint Task Force 636 and was led by Group Captain Tim Innes. The force had a strength of about 170 personnel and involved the following ADF units:
 A small ADF support and command element 
 Two C-130 Hercules from No. 37 Squadron RAAF
 One C-17 Globemaster III from No. 36 Squadron RAAF
 Three DHC-4 Caribou from No. 38 Squadron RAAF
 HMAS Wewak
 One Beechcraft Super King Air from the 173rd Surveillance Squadron 
 Three S-70A Blackhawks from B Squadron, 5th Aviation Regiment
 Navy clearance divers
 A health assessment team from 1st Health Support Battalion 
 An engineering team

References

 Australian Department of Defence Operation Papua New Guinea Assist

Papua New Guinea Assist
2007 in Australia
2007 in Papua New Guinea